The Music and Ballet School of Baghdad (Arabic, مدرسة بغداد للموسيقى و الباليه) was founded in Baghdad, Iraq in 1967. It was initially opened as part of Saddam Hussein's secularist cultural campaign.

Teachers from the Bolshoi Theater in Russia came to Baghdad to teach. At present the teaching staff are fully Iraqi.

In March 2016, the Associated Press reported that the school was facing financial difficulties owing to the government's budgetary crisis. According to the report, the Ministry of Culture had ordered the school to begin charging tuition.

References 

Educational institutions established in 1967
Ballet schools
Music schools in Iraq
Education in Baghdad
1967 establishments in Iraq
Ballet in Iraq